Part Thirteen (Part XIII) of the Constitution of Albania is the thirteenth of eighteen parts. Titled Public Finances, it consists of 7 articles.

Public Finances

References

13